The Suzuki K engine family is a series of all aluminium inline-three or four cylinder automobile engines from Suzuki, introduced in 1994. The displacement is ranging from 0.7 L to 1.5 L. This is a timing chain head driven DOHC 4-valve per cylinder engine with using multipoint fuel injection or direct injection fuel system, turbocharged for some variants and also available with hybrid electric technology.

Since 2013, some of the K engines range has been upgraded with Dualjet technology. The upgrades including new two injectors per cylinder, smaller compression chamber, increasing the compression ratio, improving the thermal efficiency, redesigned water jacket shape, adding piston cooling oil jets, adoption of water-cooled EGR system and several other changes for fuel efficiency. The turbocharged variant with direct injection fuel system is called Boosterjet.

Furthermore, a mild hybrid technology with 12 or 48-volt Integrated Motor Generator (ISG) dubbed as Smart Hybrid Vehicle by Suzuki (SHVS) is also available for markets with stricter emission regulation, such as in Europe, Japan, Singapore and India. This mild hybrid technology is helping to increase fuel mileage, providing optional acceleration and also reduce the emissions. The strong hybrid variant with Motor Generator Unit (MGU) is also available in Europe and Japan.

Three-cylinder

K6A
 
This is the first K engine that appeared in 1994 and was discontinued in 2018. It is the smallest in the family and also the first K engine with VVT. This engine was available in several versions, such as naturally aspirated, turbocharged, lean-burn, CNG and strong hybrid. The hybrid version was also the first hybrid engine in the kei car class and only available for Suzuki Twin.

Technical specifications:
Displacement: 
Bore and stroke: 68 mm x 60.4 mm
Valvetrain: DOHC, 12-valve, with or without VVT
Compression ratio: 8.4–8.9 (turbo), 10.5 (NA)
Maximum power:
 at 5500–6500 rpm (NA)
 at 6000–6500rpm (turbo)
 at 6500 rpm (CNG)
Maximum torque:
 at 3500–4000 rpm (NA)
 at 3000–3500rpm (turbo)
 at 3500 rpm (CNG)

Applications:

Naturally aspirated
1995–2018 Suzuki Jimny
1997–2012 Suzuki Wagon R/Mazda AZ-Wagon
1998–2008 Suzuki Kei
1998–2014 Suzuki Alto
1998–2014 Mazda Carol
1999–2006 Mazda Laputa
2001–2011 Suzuki MR Wagon/Nissan Moco
2001–2013 Suzuki Carry/Every
2001–2013 Mazda Scrum Truck
2002–2008 Mazda Spiano
2002–2015 Suzuki Alto Lapin
2003–2005 Suzuki Twin
2004–2009 Arctic Cat T660
2006–2009 Suzuki Cervo
2008–2013 Suzuki Palette
2009–2013 Nissan Roox
2010–2010 Nissan Pino
2012–2013 Mazda Flair Wagon

Turbocharged
1994–1998 Suzuki Alto
1995–1998 Suzuki Cappuccino
1995–2018 Suzuki Jimny
1997–2012 Suzuki Wagon R/Mazda AZ-Wagon
1998–2008 Suzuki Kei
1998–2008 Mazda AZ-Offroad
1999–2006 Mazda Laputa
2001–2011 Suzuki MR Wagon/Nissan Moco
2001–2013 Suzuki Every/Mazda Scrum Van
2002–2008 Mazda Spiano
2002–2015 Suzuki Alto Lapin
2004–2009 Arctic Cat T660 Turbo (110 hp)
2006–2009 Suzuki Cervo
2008–2013 Suzuki Palette
2009–2013 Nissan Roox
2012–2013 Mazda Flair Wagon
2013–2017 Caterham 7 160/165 (80 hp)

K10B

The three-cylinder 1.0-litre version of K engine, fitted in many Suzuki's city cars since 2008. In 2014, this engine was reworked by increasing the compression ratio from 10.0 to 11.0:1 and known as K-Next. This changes claimed to increase the petrol mileage over 23km/L, achieved maximum power on lower rev and reduced frictional losses. CNG variant also available for Indian domestic market.

Technical specifications:
Displacement:  
Bore and stroke: 73 mm x 79.4 mm
Valvetrain: DOHC, 12-valve
Compression ratio: 10.0–11.0
Maximum power:
 at 6000 rpm
 at 6000 rpm (CNG)
Maximum torque:
 at 3500 rpm
 at 3500 rpm (CNG)

Applications:
2008–2014 Suzuki Splash
2008–2014 Opel/Vauxhall Agila ecoFLEX
2009–2014 Suzuki Alto/A-Star/Nissan Pixo
2009–2014 Maruti Suzuki Estilo/Karimun Estilo (India & Indonesia)
2010–present Suzuki Wagon R (India[2010-2022], Pakistan & Sri Lanka)
2010–2020 Suzuki Alto K10
2013–2021 Suzuki Karimun Wagon R (Indonesia)
2014–present Suzuki Celerio/Cultus (India [2014-2021])
2019–present Suzuki S-Presso

K10C

Reworked version of K10B engine with naturally aspirated Dualjet or turbocharged direct injection Boosterjet technology. The compression ratio was increased from 11.0:1 to 12.0:1 for more thermal efficiency and reduced frictional losses. Suzuki's 
SHVS mild hybrid system is available for this engine in European and Japanese market. The CNG version is also available for Indian market.

Technical specifications:
Displacement:  
Bore and stroke: 73 mm x 79.4 mm
Valvetrain: DOHC, 12-valve, Single or Dual VVT
Compression ratio: 10.0 (turbo), 12.0 (NA)
Maximum power:
 at 5500–6000 rpm (NA)
 at 5300 rpm (CNG)
 at 1000 rpm (electric motor)
 at 5500 rpm (turbo)
Maximum torque: 
 at 3500 rpm (NA)
 at 3400 rpm (CNG)
 at 1500–4500 rpm (turbo)
 at 100 rpm (electric motor)

Applications:
Naturally aspirated
2015–present Suzuki Celerio
2022–present (Maruti) Suzuki Wagon R
2022–present (Maruti) Suzuki Alto K10
2022–present Suzuki S-Presso

Turbocharged
2015–2022 Suzuki Baleno
2016–2021 Suzuki SX4 S-Cross (Europe)
2017–present Suzuki Swift
2017–present Suzuki Xbee
2018–2021 Suzuki Vitara (Europe)
2023–present Suzuki Fronx

Four-cylinder

K10A
The smallest four-cylinder K-series engine.

Technical specifications:
Displacement:  
Bore and stroke: 68 mm x 68.6 mm
Valvetrain: DOHC, 16-valve, with or without VVT
Compression ratio: 8.4 (turbo), 10.0 (NA)
Maximum power:
 at 6500–7000 rpm (NA)
 at 6500 rpm (turbo)
Maximum torque:
 at 3500 rpm (NA)
 at 4000 rpm (turbo)

Applications:
Naturally aspirated
1997–2002 Suzuki Wagon R+
1999–2001 Chevrolet Wagon R+ (Colombia/Ecuador)
1999–2003 Chevrolet Alto (Colombia/Ecuador)
2000–2002 Chevrolet MW (Japan)

Turbocharged
1997–2000 Suzuki Wagon R+ (Japan)
2000–2002 Chevrolet MW (Japan)

K12A
Technical specifications:
Displacement:  
Bore and stroke: 71 mm x 74 mm
Valvetrain: DOHC, 16-valve
Compression ratio: 9.3
Maximum power:
 at 6000 rpm
Maximum torque:
 at 3250 rpm

Applications:
1998–2000 Suzuki Wagon R+ (Europe)

K12B
Appeared first in 2008 and reworked with Dualjet technology in 2013. In China, this engine was also used by Suzuki's former joint venture partners, Changan Suzuki and its subsidiaries. Known under E-Power EA12 or JL473Q names.

Technical specifications:
Displacement:  
Bore and stroke: 73 mm x 74.2 mm
Valvetrain: DOHC, 16-valve, VVT
Compression ratio: 11.0–12.0
Maximum power:
 at 5500–6000 rpm
Maximum torque:
 at 4400–4800 rpm

Applications:
2008–2014 Suzuki Splash
2008–2014 Opel/Vauxhall Agila
2010–2017 Suzuki Swift
2011–2015 Suzuki Solio/Mitsubishi Delica D:2
2012–present Changan/Changhe/Chana Star series
2013–2016 Changan CX20
2014–present Suzuki Ciaz
2014–present Changan SC6418
2019–present Esemka Bima 1.2

K12C
The Dualjet version of K12B engine and can also combined with 12-volt SHVS mild hybrid technology or a strong hybrid system with Motor Generator Unit (MGU).

Technical specifications:
Displacement:  
Bore and stroke: 73 mm x 74.2 mm
Valvetrain: DOHC, 16-valve, Dual VVT
Compression ratio: 12.5
Maximum power:
 at 6000 rpm
 at 1000 rpm (mild hybrid electric motor)
 at 3185–8000 rpm (strong hybrid electric motor)
Maximum torque:
 at 4400 rpm
 at 100 rpm (mild hybrid electric motor)
 at 1000–3185 rpm (strong hybrid electric motor)

Applications:
2015–present Suzuki Solio/Mitsubishi Delica D:2
2017–present Suzuki Swift
2015–present Suzuki Ignis
2015–2020 Suzuki Baleno (Europe and Japan)

K12D
Replacing the previous K12C Dualjet engine for European (and several other markets), as the European emission standard has moved to Euro 6d stage. The displacement is the same as K12M and K12N Dualjet engines. The SHVS mild hybrid system is also standard.

Technical specifications:
Displacement:  
Bore and stroke: 73 mm x 71.5 mm
Valvetrain: DOHC, 16-valve, Dual VVT
Compression ratio: 13.0
Maximum power:
 at 6000 rpm
 at 800 rpm (electric motor)
Maximum torque:
 at 2000 rpm
 at 499 rpm (electric motor)

Applications:
2020–present Suzuki Swift Hybrid
2020–present Suzuki Ignis Hybrid

K12M

Destroked version of the K12B, developed by Maruti Suzuki. Mainly for the Indian market as the country imposed higher excise tax for petrol engines larger than 1,200 cc. This engine is also available for markets in South East Asia, South America and Africa.

VVT technology was added for this engine in 2012. In February 2018, the Dualjet version was introduced first in Thailand with higher 11.5:1 compression ratio.

Technical specifications:
Displacement:  
Bore and stroke: 73 mm x 71.5 mm 
Valvetrain: DOHC, 16-valve, with or without VVT
Compression ratio: 10.5–11.5
Maximum power:
 at 6000 rpm
 at 6000 rpm (CNG)
Maximum torque:
 at 4000–4400 rpm
 at 4000 rpm (CNG)

Applications:
2009–2016 Suzuki Splash/Maruti Ritz
2010–2021 Suzuki Swift
2010–2021 Suzuki Dzire
2015–2022 Suzuki Baleno (India)
2017–present Suzuki Ignis
2019–2022 Suzuki Wagon R (India)
2019–2022 Toyota Glanza (India)

K12N
Dualjet version of K12M engine with and also available with SHVS mild hybrid technology.

Technical specifications:
Displacement:  
Bore and stroke: 73 mm x 71.5 mm
Valvetrain: DOHC, 16-valve, Dual VVT
Compression ratio: 12.0
Maximum power:
 at 6000 rpm
 at 6000 rpm (CNG)
Maximum torque:
 at 4200 rpm
 at 4300 rpm (CNG)

Applications:
2020–present Suzuki Dzire (India)
2021–present Suzuki Swift (India)
2019–present Suzuki Baleno/Toyota Glanza (India)
2022–present Suzuki Wagon R (India)
2023–present Suzuki Fronx

K14B
Similar as K12B, this engine was also used by Suzuki's former joint venture partner in China. Known under E-Power EA14 or JL473Q1 names.

Technical specifications:
Displacement:  
Bore and stroke: 73 mm x 82 mm 
Valvetrain: DOHC, 16-valve, VVT
Compression ratio: 10.0–11.0
Maximum power:
 at 6000 rpm
 at 6000 rpm (CNG)
Maximum torque:
 at 4000–4800 rpm
 at 4000–4800 rpm (CNG)

Applications:
2010–2017 Suzuki Swift
2011–2018 Changhe Spla (China/South America)
2012–present Changhe Big Dipper
2012–present Changhe Suzuki Landy/Coolcar
2012–2016 Changhe Ideal
2012–2019 Suzuki Ertiga
2013–2015 Chana Eulove
2013–present Changan Alsvin
2013–2016 Changan CX20
2013–2017 Mazda VX-1 (Indonesia)
2013–2018 Changhe Suzuki Liana (China)
2014–present Changan Benni
2014–2015 Chana Taurustar
2014–2017 Changan Alsvin V3
2014–present Suzuki Ciaz
2015–present Changhe Freedom M50
2016–2019 Proton Ertiga (Malaysia)
2017–2022 Suzuki Baleno
2020–2022 Toyota Starlet (Africa)

K14C

Boosterjet version of K14B engine with direct injection and turbocharger. This engine is no longer available since mid-2020 for European market and replaced by K14D Boosterjet mild hybrid engine.

Technical specifications:
Displacement:  
Bore and stroke: 73 mm x 82 mm
Valvetrain: DOHC, 16-valve, VVT
Compression ratio: 9.9
Maximum power:
 at 5500 rpm
Maximum torque:
 at 1500–4000 rpm

Applications:
2015–present Suzuki Vitara/Escudo
2016–present Suzuki SX4 S-Cross
2018–present Suzuki Swift Sport

K14D
Reworked K14C Boosterjet engine for European market. Combined with a 48-volt SHVS mild hybrid technology to pass Euro 6d emission standard.

Technical specifications:
Displacement:  
Bore and stroke: 73 mm x 82 mm
Valvetrain: DOHC, 16-valve, Dual VVT
Compression ratio: 10.8
Maximum power:
 at 5500 rpm
 at 3000 rpm (electric motor)
Maximum torque:
 at 2000 rpm
 at 3000 rpm

Applications:
2020–present Suzuki SX4 S-Cross Hybrid (Europe)
2020–present Suzuki Swift Sport Hybrid (Europe, Singapore, Taiwan, Hong Kong and Macau)
2020–present Suzuki Vitara Hybrid (Europe)

K15B

The biggest engine in the range. SHVS mild hybrid system also available and claimed over 17% more fuel efficient that the non-SHVS engine.

Technical specifications:
Displacement:  
Bore and stroke: 74 mm x 85 mm
Valvetrain: DOHC, 16-valve, VVT
Compression ratio: 10.0–10.5
Maximum power:
 at 6000 rpm
 at 6000 rpm (CNG)
Maximum torque:
 4000–4400 rpm
 at 4400 rpm (CNG)

Applications:
2018–present Suzuki Ciaz Hybrid (India)
2018–present Suzuki Ertiga
2018–present Suzuki Jimny Sierra
2019–present Suzuki XL6/XL7
2020–present Suzuki S-Cross Hybrid (India)
2020–present Suzuki Vitara Brezza/Toyota Urban Cruiser
2021–present Toyota Belta (Middle East)
2022–present Suzuki Baleno

K15B-C

This engine is similar as the regular K15B, but designed for commercial use. The differences are including different cylinder head cover made from metal with 7 bolts instead of resin material with 12 bolts on the regular K15B engine, different intake manifold position, shorter camshaft profile, lower compression ratio pistons, different timing chain cover design without engine mount (similar as previous generation Suzuki Carry) and different oil pan shape.

Technical specifications:
Displacement:  
Bore and stroke: 74 mm x 85 mm
Valvetrain: DOHC, 16-valve
Compression ratio: 10.0
Maximum power:
 at 5600 rpm
Maximum torque:
 at 4400 rpm

Application:
2019–present Suzuki Carry (International model)

K15C 
Dualjet version of K15B engine, it is available in Europe and Japan with 140V strong hybrid combined to a Motor Generator Unit (MGU). Mild hybrid and CNG version is also available, the latter is only available in India.

Technical specifications:
Displacement:  
Bore and stroke: 74 mm x 85 mm
Valvetrain: DOHC, 16-valve, Dual VVT
Compression ratio: 12.0-13.0
Maximum power:
 at 6000 rpm
 at 5500 rpm (CNG)
 at 900 rpm (MHEV electric motor)
 at 5500 rpm (HEV electric motor)
 at 5500 rpm (petrol + HEV electric motor)
Maximum torque:
 at 4400 rpm
 at 4200 rpm
 at 100-2000 rpm (HEV electric motor)

Application:
2022–present Suzuki Brezza
2022–present Suzuki Ertiga (India)
2022–present Suzuki Grand Vitara/Toyota Urban Cruiser Hyryder
2022–present Suzuki SX4 S-Cross Full Hybrid (Europe)
2022–present Suzuki Vitara/Escudo Full Hybrid (Europe/Japan)
2022–present Suzuki XL6 (India)

See also
 List of Suzuki engines

References

Suzuki engines